Kibatalia is a genus of trees and shrubs in the family Apocynaceae, tribe Malouetieae, first described as a genus in 1826. It was initially called Hasseltia, but this turned out to be an illegitimate homonym (in other words, someone else had already used the name for another plant). So Kibatalia was chosen as a replacement name. Kibatalia is native to China and Southeast Asia.

Species
 Kibatalia arborea (Blume) G.Don – Thailand, Philippines, W Malaysia, Borneo,  Sumatra, Java, Sulawesi
 Kibatalia blancoi (Rolfe ex Stapf) Merr. – Philippines
 Kibatalia borneensis (Stapf) Merr. – Sarawak
 Kibatalia elmeri Woodson – Luzon
 Kibatalia gitingensis (Elmer) Woodson – Philippines
 Kibatalia laurifolia (Ridl.) Woodson – Vietnam, Cambodia, Thailand, W Malaysia
 Kibatalia longifolia Merr. – Mindanao
 Kibatalia macgregori (Elmer) Woodson – Sibuyan
 Kibatalia macrophylla (Pierre ex Hua) Woodson – Yunnan, Indochina
 Kibatalia maingayi (Hook.f.) Woodson – Thailand, W Malaysia, Borneo, Sumatra, Mindanao
 Kibatalia merrilliana Woodson – Leyte, Samar
 Kibatalia puberula Merr. – Samar in Philippines
 Kibatalia stenopetala Merr. – Luzon, Dinagat, Mindanao
 Kibatalia villosa Rudjiman – W Malaysia, Borneo
 Kibatalia wigmani (Koord.) Merr. – Sulawesi

formerly included
 Kibatalia africana (Benth.) Merr. = Funtumia africana (Benth.) Stapf
 Kibatalia elastica (Preuss) Merr. = Funtumia elastica (Preuss) Stapf
 Kibatalia latifolia (Stapf) Merr. = Funtumia africana (Benth.) Stapf
 Kibatalia scheffieri (K.Schum.) Merr. = Funtumia africana (Benth.) Stapf
 Kibatalia zenkeri (K.Schum.) Merr. = Funtumia africana (Benth.) Stapf

References

 
Apocynaceae genera
Taxonomy articles created by Polbot